New York Women in Film & Television (NYWIFT) is a non-profit membership organization for professional women in film, television and digital media. The organization is an educational forum for media professionals, and a network for the exchange of information, and resources.

History 
NYWIFT was founded in 1977 and brings together more than 2,000 professionals, including EMMY and Academy Award winners, who work in all areas of the entertainment industry — above and below the line. It is a part of a network of 40 international branches of Women in Cinema, representing more than 10,000 members worldwide.

The annual New York Women in Film & Television Muse Awards is a glamorous luncheon to honor prominent film and television personalities. Designing Women, an annual gala co-presented by Variety, was created by NYWIFT to acknowledge and celebrate the influence and impact of costume designers, make-up artists, and hair stylists on film and television.

Presidents 

 Marilyn Casselman (1977–1980)
 Gail Frank (1980–1981)
 Jeanne Betancourt (1981–1982)
 Victoria Hamburg (1982–1983)
 Celeste Gainey (1983–1985)
 Mary Feldbauer Jansen (1985–1986)
 Nancy Leff (1986–1987)
 Pat Fili (1987–1988)
 Pat Herold (1988–1989)
 Mirra Bank Brockman (1989–1990)
 Marjorie Kalins (1990–1991)
 Grace Blake (1991–1992)
 Beth Dembitzer (1992–1994)
 Harlene Freezer (1994–1996)
 Joy Pereths (1996–1998)
 Ellen Geiger (1998–2000)
 Marcie Setlow (2000–2003)
 Linda Kahn (2003–2005)
 Carey Graeber (2005–2007)
 Laverne Berry (2007–2010)
 Alexandra Levi (2010–2012)
 Alexis Alexanian (2012–2017)
 Simone Pero (2017–2019)
 Jamie Zelermyer (2019–present)

Programs 
NYWIFT produces over 50 programs and special events annually; advocates for women in the industry; and, recognizes and encourages the contributions of women in the field.

In 2016 NYWIFT partnered with The Art of Brooklyn Film Festival to produce a panel titled 'Women in Entertainment: Power Players Changing the Parity Game' that discussed women's representation in front of and behind the camera.

New York Women in Film & Television is involved in several special funds that not only support future and current filmmakers, but also preserve the work of women filmmakers of the past; The Archive Project, Loreen Arbus Scholarship, Women in Film Finishing Fund, Scholarship Fund, and Women's Film Preservation Fund.

In 2015 it was announced that Meryl Streep had funded a screenwriters lab for female screenwriters over forty years old, called the Writers Lab, to be run by New York Women in Film & Television and the collective IRIS. As of the announcement, the Writers Lab is the only initiative in the world for female screenwriters over forty years old.

See also 
Women in Film and Television International
Women in Film Crystal + Lucy Awards
Women in Film and Television (South Africa)

References

External links 
 New York Women in Film and Television (official website)

Non-profit organizations based in New York (state)
Women's film organizations
Organizations established in 1977
1977 establishments in New York (state)
Women in television
Sculptures of women in New York City
Women's organizations based in the United States